Gabrielle Camille Celada Basiano (born 17 December 1997), also known as Gabby Basiano, is a Filipino model and beauty pageant titleholder who was crowned Binibining Pilipinas Intercontinental 2022. She represented the Philippines at Miss Intercontinental 2022 in Sharm El Sheikh, Egypt and placed at the Top 20.

Early life and education 
Gabrielle Camille Celada Basiano was born in Borongan, Eastern Samar to Manuelito and Mary Basiano. She studied BS Tourism at the Asian Development Foundation College in Tacloban City. Binibining Pilipinas Globe 2022 Chelsea Fernandez of Tacloban was her schoolmate.

She considers Miss Universe 2018 Catriona Gray as one of her role models in pageantry and addressing mental health issues as her advocacy.

Pageantry

Miss Earth Philippines 2018
On 19 May 2018, Basiano competed at Miss Earth Philippines 2018 and represented Tacloban.  
During the course of the preliminary events, she won the following awards:
 Bronze Medal for Resorts Wear Competition
 Miss Hannah Beach Resort 1st Runner Up
During the coronation night, Basiano was called to be part of the Top 18 semifinalists while the Filipino-Italian candidate Celeste Cortesi won the crown.

Miss Friendship International 2019 
On 27 July 2019, Basiano won the Miss Friendship International 2019 first runner-up title in the global pageant held in Chengdu, China in a tie with Lorena Rodrigues of Brazil. She competed against 48 candidates from all over the world, one month after she was crowned as the Philippines' first Ambassador of Tourism. Emilia Dobreva of Serbia won the title for that year.

Binibining Pilipinas 2021 
Representing Borongan, Basiano won Best in Long Gown and became the first runner-up for the Binibining Pilipinas 2021, which was held at Quezon City on 11 July 2021. Her gown dubbed as "Perla" was designed by Ken Batino and Jevin Salaysay and earned her the Best in Long Gown award. Explaining her choice of the dress, Basiano said:

Binibining Pilipinas 2022 
Returning again for the Binibining Pilipinas 2022 representing Borongan, Basiano won Best in Swimsuit, Best in Evening Gown, and was crowned as Binibining Pilipinas Intercontinental 2022. Nicole Borromeo of Cebu was named as Binibining Pilipinas International 2022, Chelsea Fernandez of Tacloban as Binibining Pilipinas Globe 2022, and Roberta Tamondong of San Pablo, Laguna as Binibining Pilipinas Grand International 2022.

During the question-and-answer portion of the pageant, she was asked by guest panelist Sen. Risa Hontiveros with the following question: "Pageants are a celebration of beauty and goodwill. However, there’s also a lot of toxicity online and offline that fails to empower us, women. If you win as our Binibini, how will you deal with fake news and other negative comments criticizing your looks, intelligence, and the way you live your life?" Basiano answered, saying: 

Hours after the coronation, rumors sparked that there was a crown mix-up between Basiano and Nicole Borromeo because of the delayed announcement of Borromeo as winner of Binibining Pilipinas International 2022. Both beauty queens explained in the end that there was no such thing as a mix-up that happened during the coronation.

Miss Intercontinental 2022 
Basiano represented the Philippines as Miss Intercontinental 2022 in Sharm El Sheikh, Egypt at 14 October 2022, and placed among the Top 20 semi-finalists. However, she did not make it to Top 5.

References

External links

1997 births
Living people
Binibining Pilipinas winners
Filipino female models
People from Borongan